Llandrindod railway station,  south-west of , serves the town of Llandrindod Wells in Mid Wales. The single-track Heart of Wales Line is served by five Transport for Wales trains each way on Mondays to Saturdays, two each way on Sundays. The passing line for northbound and southbound trains is used daily. It is the busiest station on the line itself, despite the small number of trains. This causes overcrowding on some trains.

History
The station was opened in 1865, as the terminus of a branch line from Knighton by the Central Wales Railway which was absorbed by the LNWR soon after completion. Construction of the Central Wales Extension Railway (another LNWR-backed project) southwards towards Llandovery started soon after and upon completion of this line in 1868 placed the town on a through route between Craven Arms and Swansea.

The line through the station was singled as an economy measure in the 1960s, although a passing loop was left a short distance to the north, near the town's level crossing. However the loop was relocated to the station in 1986 by British Rail as part of the signalling modernisation scheme that centralised control at Pantyffynnon. The level crossing was converted to train-crew operation at the same time, whilst the signal box was closed . The redundant No. 2 signal box was relocated to the station in 1990, after closure, and restored to working order as a museum. It stands on the southbound platform and opens to the public at certain times.

The passing-loop point machines were replaced on 22 August 2010 under a £5 million Network Rail modernisation scheme to renew the points at all five loops on the route.

Facilities
The station has the only staffed ticket office on the line, staffed on a part-time basis. This is sited within the main building on the southbound platform. When the ticket office is closed, tickets may be purchased on the train. There is a waiting room within the buildings on the northbound side and canopies provide a covered waiting area on the southbound side. Digital display screens, customer help points and timetable poster boards are provided on both platforms, which are linked by an accessible ramped footbridge. A pay phone and post box are also provided, but no toilets. The nearest public ones are in Station Crescent.

Notes

References
G. Body (1983), PSL Field Guides – Railways of the Western Region, Patrick Stephens Ltd, Wellingborough,

Further reading

External links

Llandrindod Wells
Railway stations in Powys
DfT Category E stations
Former London and North Western Railway stations
Railway stations in Great Britain opened in 1865
Railway stations served by Transport for Wales Rail
Heart of Wales Line